Linda annamensis is a species of beetle in the family Cerambycidae. It was described by Stephan von Breuning in 1954.

Subspecies
 Linda annamensis annamensis Breuning, 1954
 Linda annamensis yunnanensis Breuning, 1960

References

annamensis
Beetles described in 1954